List of Scotland 'B' international players is a list of people who have played for Scotland 'B'.

Scotland 'B' international matches took place between 1971 and 1992. The name of the Anglo-Scots district side is used here as it was commonly used at that time period; they changed their name in 1992 to be known as the Scottish Exiles side to better reflect the Scottish diaspora.

Players in BOLD font have been capped by Scotland.

Players in Italic font have capped either by the Scotland international 7s side; or by the Scotland international XV 'A' side.

A position in parentheses indicates that the player debuted as a substitute.

Amateur Era. (1871-1996) Capped at District level:

Notes

This list follows the SRU 2007-2008 Scottish Rugby Record which has the last list detailing the Scotland 'B' international players.

The 2007-2008 list ignores the 25 February 1976 Scotland 'B' match against the Royal Navy, both in debuts and in the player 'B' cap totals, and that omission is followed in this list.

All Scotland 'B' players that featured in that match were either already capped at 'B' level or subsequently capped.

There are players listed elsewhere like Eddie Pollock and James Scobbie that are sometimes recorded as 'B' internationals, but these players are not recorded on the 2007-2008 list, and are thus also omitted.

References

Season 1971-72

13 November 1971https://news.google.com/newspapers?nid=GGgVawPscysC&dat=19711115&printsec=frontpage&hl=en p5

Season 1972-73

11 November 1972 https://www.britishnewspaperarchive.co.uk/viewer/bl/0000445/19721110/251/0019
https://news.google.com/newspapers?nid=GGgVawPscysC&dat=19721113&printsec=frontpage&hl=en p5

Season 1973-74

17 Feb 1974 https://www.britishnewspaperarchive.co.uk/viewer/bl/0000578/19740218/324/0015 17 Feb 1974
https://news.google.com/newspapers?nid=GGgVawPscysC&dat=19740218&printsec=frontpage&hl=en p5

Season 1974-75

18 Jan 1975 https://www.britishnewspaperarchive.co.uk/viewer/bl/0000445/19750117/347/0016
https://www.britishnewspaperarchive.co.uk/viewer/bl/0000445/19750118/155/0007
https://news.google.com/newspapers?nid=GGgVawPscysC&dat=19750120&printsec=frontpage&hl=en p18

Season 1975-76

25 February 1976 v Royal Navy https://issuu.com/navynews/docs/197510/37
https://news.google.com/newspapers?nid=GGgVawPscysC&dat=19760226&printsec=frontpage&hl=en p16

7 March 1976 https://www.britishnewspaperarchive.co.uk/viewer/bl/0002240/19760227/265/0014
http://vi.vipr.ebaydesc.com/ws/eBayISAPI.dll?ViewItemDescV4&item=302201380595&t=0&category=75704&seller=rugbyrelics*com&excSoj=1&excTrk=1&lsite=3&ittenable=false&domain=ebay.com&descgauge=1&cspheader=1&oneClk=2&secureDesc=0
https://news.google.com/newspapers?nid=GGgVawPscysC&dat=19760308&printsec=frontpage&hl=en p18

Season 1976-77

5 Feb 1977 France B H https://news.google.com/newspapers?nid=GGgVawPscysC&dat=19770207&printsec=frontpage&hl=en p16

Season 1977-78

3 Dec 1977 Ireland B H https://news.google.com/newspapers?nid=GGgVawPscysC&dat=19771205&printsec=frontpage&hl=en p16

19 March 1978 France B A https://www.britishnewspaperarchive.co.uk/viewer/BL/0000578/19780320/248/0015?browse=true

Season 1978-79

17 February 1979 - France B match cancelled

Season 1979-80

1 December 1979 Ireland B A https://www.ebay.co.uk/itm/301727770828?hash=item46406068cc:g:CHIAAOSwd0BV5E8l
https://news.google.com/newspapers?nid=GGgVawPscysC&dat=19791203&printsec=frontpage&hl=en p16/10

20 January 1980 France B A https://news.google.com/newspapers?nid=GGgVawPscysC&dat=19800121&printsec=frontpage&hl=en p20

Season 1980-81

7 March 1981 France B H https://news.google.com/newspapers?nid=GGgVawPscysC&dat=19810309&printsec=frontpage&hl=en p16

Season 1981-82

7 February 1982 France B A https://www.ebay.co.uk/itm/390495380801?hash=item5aeb56a541:g:Q58AAOxyOM5RcO7I
https://news.google.com/newspapers?nid=GGgVawPscysC&dat=19820208&printsec=frontpage&hl=en p18

Season 1982-83

19 March 1983 France B H https://news.google.com/newspapers?nid=GGgVawPscysC&dat=19830321&printsec=frontpage&hl=en p16

Season 1983-84

3 December 1983 Ireland B H https://news.google.com/newspapers?nid=GGgVawPscysC&dat=19831205&printsec=frontpage&hl=en p14

19 February 1984 France B A https://www.ebay.co.uk/itm/300812752299?hash=item4609d655ab:g:aNUAAMXQlrxRbR0a
https://www.ebay.co.uk/itm/300829411841?hash=item460ad48a01:g:EpQAAMXQSnVRarG2
https://news.google.com/newspapers?nid=GGgVawPscysC&dat=19840220&printsec=frontpage&hl=en p18

Season 1984-85

1 December 1984 Ireland B A https://www.ebay.co.uk/itm/171699917225?hash=item27fa1cd1a9:g:SfIAAOSwY-NeKCKF
https://news.google.com/newspapers?nid=GGgVawPscysC&dat=19841203&printsec=frontpage&hl=en

19 January 1985 France B H https://www.ebay.co.uk/itm/181710674751?hash=item2a4eccdb3f:g:cPAAAOSweW5VIwjq

Season 1985-86

7 December 1985 Italy B H https://www.ebay.co.uk/itm/182986188453?hash=item2a9ad3a6a5:g:2SIAAOSw7PNeKuPP
https://news.google.com/newspapers?nid=GGgVawPscysC&dat=19851209&printsec=frontpage&hl=en p11

2 March 1986 France B A https://www.ebay.co.uk/itm/300815551723?hash=item460a010ceb:g:5vcAAOxyPLpRclk-
https://news.google.com/newspapers?nid=GGgVawPscysC&dat=19860303&printsec=frontpage&hl=en p7

Season 1986-87

7 December 1986 Italy B A https://news.google.com/newspapers?nid=GGgVawPscysC&dat=19861208&printsec=frontpage&hl=en p9

7 February 1987 France B H https://news.google.com/newspapers?nid=GGgVawPscysC&dat=19870209&printsec=frontpage&hl=en p11

Season 1987-88

5 December 1987 Italy B H https://news.google.com/newspapers?nid=GGgVawPscysC&dat=19871207&printsec=frontpage&hl=en p11

20 March 1988 France B A https://www.ebay.co.uk/itm/300816191259?hash=item460a0acf1b:g:IfoAAOxyJs5Rc44x
https://news.google.com/newspapers?nid=GGgVawPscysC&dat=19880321&printsec=frontpage&hl=en p11

Season 1988-89

4 December 1988 Italy B A
https://www.britishnewspaperarchive.co.uk/viewer/bl/0000445/19881123/318/0018
https://www.britishnewspaperarchive.co.uk/viewer/bl/0003741/19881205/031/0031

18 February 1989 France B H https://www.ebay.co.uk/itm/301727770655?hash=item464060681f:g:4k0AAOSwTapV5E8W
https://news.google.com/newspapers?nid=GGgVawPscysC&dat=19890220&printsec=frontpage&hl=en p19/20

Season 1989-90

9 December 1989 Ireland B H https://news.google.com/newspapers?nid=GGgVawPscysC&dat=19891211&printsec=frontpage&hl=en p23

21 January 1990 France B A https://www.ebay.co.uk/itm/300660066072?hash=item4600bc8718:g:wNwAAMXQROxRe1a2
https://www.ebay.co.uk/itm/173015033979?hash=item28487fe87b:g:8m4AAOSw1kpeJc~Q
https://news.google.com/newspapers?nid=GGgVawPscysC&dat=19900122&printsec=frontpage&hl=en p21/22

Season 1990-91

22 December 1990 Ireland B A https://www.ebay.co.uk/itm/171699917225?hash=item27fa1cd1a9:g:SfIAAOSwY-NeKCKF

2 March 1991 France B H

Season 1991-92

28 December 1991 Ireland B H https://www.ebay.co.uk/itm/144233664282?hash=item2194ff0f1a:g:vZcAAOSwH5NemyN4
https://www.heraldscotland.com/news/12648868.improved-scottish-side-show-irish-too-much-generosity/

2 February 1992 France B H https://www.ebay.co.uk/itm/390494458200?hash=item5aeb489158:g:-asAAMXQlrxRbor2
https://www.britishnewspaperarchive.co.uk/viewer/bl/0000564/19920121/193/0014

 

Lists of Scotland national rugby union players